Virginia "Gi-Gi" Miller-Johnson (born January 12, 1979 in Huntsville, Alabama) is a world class heptathlete and former US champion.

Collegiate career

Competing for the Arkansas Lady Razorbacks in 2000 and 2001, Miller set school records in the 100-meter hurdles, high jump, shot put, 200-meters, 800-meters, long jump and heptathlon.

In her first season, Miller finished 2nd in the heptathlon at the 2000 NCAA Outdoor Championships.

During her second college season, Miller won the triple jump at the 2001 NCAA Indoor Championships  That same year, she won the heptathlon at the Southeastern Conference Outdoor Championships.

Professional career

Following her college season, Miller finished 3rd in the heptathlon at the 2001 USA Outdoor Championships. She finished 2nd in 2005 and won the title at the 2006 event.

In her efforts to make the US Olympic team, she finished 6th in 2004 and 4th in 2008, missing the team by ten points.

Miller-Johnson currently lives and trains in State College, Pennsylvania, with her husband and coach, Chris Johnson.

Rankings

Since bursting onto the scene in 2000, Miller-Johnson has been consistently ranked among the top heptathletes in the US by Track and Field News.

References

Living people
1979 births
Sportspeople from Huntsville, Alabama
American heptathletes
African-American female track and field athletes
American female triple jumpers
Pan American Games track and field athletes for the United States
Athletes (track and field) at the 2007 Pan American Games
World Athletics Championships athletes for the United States
Arkansas Razorbacks women's track and field athletes
21st-century African-American sportspeople
21st-century African-American women
20th-century African-American sportspeople
20th-century African-American women